Reginald "Reg" Jirod Jefferson (born September 25, 1968) is a former designated hitter who played for from 1991 to 1999 the Cincinnati Reds, Cleveland Indians, Seattle Mariners and the Boston Red Sox.

Playing career
Reggie attended Lincoln High School in Tallahassee; he was a three-sport star, lettering in baseball, basketball and football.

He was traded in the winter of 1993 by Cleveland to Seattle for speedy shortstop Omar Vizquel. He also played one season in Japan for the Seibu Lions in 2000.

For the Red Sox in 1996, he hit for a batting average of .347 which would have been third highest in the league if not for falling short in at-bats needed and was given the nickname 'The Miracle' by faithful Red Sox fans. Unable to hit left-handed pitchers, he was left off the 1999 playoff roster as a result. Jefferson would never play major league baseball again.

In 680 games over nine seasons, Jefferson posted a .300 batting average (637-for-2123) with 285 runs, 131 doubles, 11 triples, 72 home runs, 300 RBI, 146 bases on balls, .349 on-base percentage and .474 slugging percentage.

Post-playing career
Jefferson has also served as a player agent. He was the hitting coach of the Albuquerque Isotopes in 2005 and the University of South Florida in 2006.

References

External links

1968 births
Living people
Baseball players from Tallahassee, Florida
Major League Baseball designated hitters
Major League Baseball first basemen
Cincinnati Reds players
Cleveland Indians players
Seattle Mariners players
Boston Red Sox players
Seibu Lions players
American expatriate baseball players in Japan
African-American baseball players
Nashville Sounds players
Pawtucket Red Sox players
Colorado Springs Sky Sox players
Canton-Akron Indians players
American sports agents
21st-century African-American people
20th-century African-American sportspeople